Tropidotrechus is a genus of beetles in the family Carabidae, containing the following species:

 Tropidotrechus bawbawensis Moore, 1972
 Tropidotrechus microps Moore, 1972
 Tropidotrechus vicinus Moore, 1972
 Tropidotrechus victoriae (Blackburn, 1894)

References

Trechinae